Chùa Bồ Đề, also known as the Bồ Đề Buddhist Temple is a Vietnamese Buddhist temple located in South Philadelphia, Pennsylvania.

The temple was established Christmas Day in 1994 after Vietnamese immigrants of the Asian American Buddhist Association of Philadelphia raised to $130,000 to purchase the abandoned Philadelphia Clef Club of Jazz. It is the first Vietnamese Buddhist temple in Philadelphia.

In 1995, a resident monk was murdered. The incident delayed renovations to the building until the end of 1997.

References

Asian-American culture in Pennsylvania
Vietnamese-American culture
Overseas Vietnamese Buddhist temples
Buddhist temples in Pennsylvania